The Great Fire of 8 July 1892 in St. John's, Newfoundland and Labrador is remembered as the worst disaster ever to befall that city. Previous "Great Fires" had occurred in St. John's, during 1819 and 1846.

Timeline
At approximately 4:45 in the afternoon of July 8, 1892, a dropped pipe in Timothy O'Brien's stable, atop Carter's Hill on Freshwater Road, began what would become the worst fire in the history of St. John's. Initially, the fire did not cause any widespread panic; however, a series of catastrophic coincidences caused the fire to spread and devour virtually all of the east end of the city, including much of its major commercial area, before being extinguished.

Rev. Moses Harvey witnessed the initial stages of the fire, and remarked to his friend that it "was a bad day for a fire." A high wind from the northwest was blowing, hurling the sparks far and wide on the roofs of the clusters of wooden houses. For a month previous, hardly any rain had fallen, and the shingled roofs were as dry as tinder." The situation was exacerbated because of work completed earlier in the day on the water mains. Although water flow was re-established by 3 p.m., two hours before the fire began, water pressure was insufficient to force water up into the higher sections of the city where the fire began. W.J. Kent remarked that the "flames therefore made headway before water was procurable and, as a very high westerly wind was furiously fanning the fire, it began to spread rapidly."

An hour into the blaze, the people of St. John's realized that the fire could not be contained in the area of O'Brien's farm. Because locals believed stone walls would withstand the flames, residents moved valuables into numerous stone buildings in the city. One of the most common refuge areas was the Anglican Cathedral of St. John the Baptist. The nave and transepts of the church were filled with valuable property belonging to numerous families, including that of the Anglican bishop Lleweyn Jones. The cathedral and much of this property were also destroyed by the ravenous fire. Kent described the burning of the cathedral as follows:

The fire was far from finished; the wind caused offshoots of the main fire to consume new sections of the city while the main fire continued its destructive trek towards the city's commercial centre, Water Street. The businesses that lined Water Street and Duckworth Street were destroyed as the fire spread throughout the downtown area.

Rev. Harvey said, 
"The beautiful shops, full of valuable goods; the stores behind, containing thousands of barrels of flour and provisions of all kinds; the fish stores; the wharves, which it had cost immense sums to erect, -- disappeared one by one into the maw of the destroyer...the whole of Water Street, on both sides, was 'swept with the besom of destruction.'"

The fire continued to burn into the night and the early hours of the next morning. Rev. Harvey's description of the restless night said that "the terror-stricken inhabitants flying before the destroyer,… the cries of weeping women hurrying with their children to places of safety -- all constituted a scene which not even the pen of Dante could describe."

Similarly, Kent said of that night,

Daybreak on the morning of July 9, 1892 revealed the full extent of the fire's devastation. Kent described the sight of local residents viewing the desolation:

Rev. Harvey presents a similar description:

Less than $5,000,000 of the total estimated losses of $13,000,000 were covered by insurance. A large influx of financial aid from Britain, Canada and the United States helped the city recover from its devastating losses.

Many of the present-day registered heritage structures were either built or re-built in the reconstruction period after the 1892 fire. The most prominent architect of this era in St. John's was John Thomas Southcott. He designed numerous Second Empire-styled buildings that had distinctive mansard roofs with bonnet-topped dormers protruding from the concave-curved roof surface. Southcott was so prolific that the term the "Southcott style" became associated with the architecture in the re-built city. Each year in Southcott's honour, the Newfoundland Historic Trust presents the Southcott Award for excellence in the restoration of heritage structures.

Because of the devastation of the fire, the city of St. John's reorganized its fire department. It had previously relied only on volunteer brigades. By the end of 1895, the city had hired 22 paid firefighters and established three new fire stations throughout the city. Control of the fire department was placed under Newfoundland Constabulary’s Inspector-General.

See also
Great Fire of 1846, also in St. John's

References

External links
Encyclopedia of Newfoundland and Labrador
Paul Butler. 1892, a 2008 novel about the fire.
Paul Butler. St. John's: City of Fire

Disasters in Newfoundland and Labrador
History of St. John's, Newfoundland and Labrador
1892 in Canada
1892 disasters in Canada
1892 fires in North America
1892 in Newfoundland
Urban fires in Canada